William Cosmo Monkhouse (18 March 184020 July 1901) was a British poet and critic.

Biography
Monkhouse was born and raised in London. His father, Cyril John Monkhouse, was a solicitor, and his mother's maiden name was Delafosse. Monkhouse was educated at St Paul's School, stopped his schooling at the age of seventeen to enter the board of trade as a junior supplementary clerk, from which grade he rose eventually to be the assistant-secretary to the finance department of the office. In 1870–1871 he visited South America in connection with the hospital accommodation for seamen at Valparaíso, Chile, and other ports; he served on different departmental committees, notably that of 1894–1896 on the Mercantile Marine Fund. Monkhouse was twice married: first, to Laura, daughter of James Keymer of Dartford; and, secondly, to Leonora Eliza, daughter of Commander Blount, R.N.

Cosmo Monkhouse was one of those who not only have a vocation, but an avocation. Cosmo's first bias was to poetry, and in 1865 he issued A Dream of Idleness and Other Poems, a collection strongly coloured by his admiration for Wordsworth and Tennyson. It was marked by exceptional maturity and scarcely received the recognition it deserved. Perhaps owing to this circumstance, it was not until 1890 that he put forth Corn and Poppies, a collection containing at least one memorable effort in the well-known "Dead March". Five years later, a limited edition of the striking ballad of The Christ upon the Hill appeared; it was illustrated with etchings by William Strang. After Cosmo's death, his poetical output was completed by Pasiteles the Elder and other Poems (including The Christ upon the Hill).

In 1868 Monkhouse wrote a novel A Question of Honour. Then, after preluding with a Life of Turner in the "Great Artists Series" (1879), he devoted himself almost exclusively to art criticism. Besides many contributions to the Academy, Saturday Review, Magazine of Art and other periodicals, he published volumes on The Italian Pre-Raphaelites (1887), The Earlier English Water-Colour Painters (1890 and 1897), In the National Gallery (1895) and British Contemporary Artists (1899). He wrote a monograph on the illustrator of Alice's Adventures in Wonderland entitled The Life and Work of Sir John Tenniel, R. I. (London: 1901). He was a contributor to the Dictionary of National Biography from the beginning. Monkhouse also wrote a life of Leigh Hunt in the "Great Writers Series" (1887). He wrote a monograph on Chinese ceramics entitled A history and description of Chinese Porcelain, (London; Chapman, 1901).

According to the Encyclopædia Britannica Eleventh Edition: "As an art critic, Monkhouse's judgments were highly valued. He had the rare gift of differing without offending, while he invariably secured respect for his honesty and ability. As a poet, his ambition was wide and his devotion to the art ... thorough."

Monkhouse died at Skegness on 2 July 1901.

Family
He was twice married: first in 1865 to Laura, daughter of James Keymer of Dartford in Kent; second in 1873 to Leonora Eliza, the daughter of Commander Blount, R.N., by whom he had two sons and six daughters.

Notes

References
 
 
 
 Dana M. Garvey: "Cosmo Monkhouse: Constructing the Late Victorian Artist". The Princeton University Library Chronicle, Vol. 69, No. 1 (Autumn 2007), pp. 140–150 (JSTOR)

External links

 
 
 

1840 births
1901 deaths
English art critics
English male poets
19th-century English poets
19th-century English male writers
English male non-fiction writers